Liman was a Russian naval intelligence vessel that sunk after a collision in 2017 which resulted in no casualties.

Description
It displaced 1,542 tons at full load. The vessel was propelled by two Zgoda-Sulzer 6TD-48 diesel engines, rated at  each. Armament was sixteen Strela-2 surface-to-air missiles.

History
The ship was built in 1970 by Stocznia Polnocna, Gdańsk as a hydrographic survey vessel and converted to military use in 1989.  It was outfitted for signals intelligence (SIGINT) purposes. It initially served with the Northern Fleet and was transferred to the Black Sea Fleet in 1974. In April 1999, Liman was deployed in the Adriatic Sea at the request of Yugoslav president Slobodan Milošević to monitor NATO operations against Yugoslavia. It also saw service during the Russian intervention in the Syrian Civil War.

Sinking
At the time it sank, the ship carried a crew of 78, all of whom were rescued: Later all crew were transferred to the Russian cargo ship . Youzarsif H proceeded to Capu Midia, Romania due to concerns about the welfare of the livestock she was carrying.

References

1970 ships
Ships built in Gdańsk
Survey ships
Electronic intelligence ships
Auxiliary ships of the Soviet Navy
Cold War naval ships of the Soviet Union
Auxiliary ships of the Russian Navy
Maritime incidents in 2017
Maritime incidents in Turkey
Ships sunk in collisions
Shipwrecks in the Black Sea
Naval ships built in Poland for export